M. pudica may refer to:
 Maxillaria pudica, an orchid species in the genus Maxillaria
 Mimosa pudica, a herb species
 Mnesarete pudica, a damselfly species in the genus Mnesarete

See also
 Pudica